The 1952 Marquette Hilltoppers football team was an American football team that represented Marquette University as an independent during the 1952 college football season. In its third season under head coach Lisle Blackbourn, the team compiled a 3–5–1 record and outscored opponents by a total of 214 to 181. The team played its home games at Marquette Stadium in Milwaukee.

Schedule

References

Marquette
Marquette Golden Avalanche football seasons
Marquette Hilltoppers football